The 2022 Whitney Biennial, titled Quiet as It's Kept, is the 80th edition of the Whitney Museum's art biennial, hosted between April and October of 2022. Described by ARTnews as the "most closely watched contemporary art exhibition in the United States." The 2022 biennial was curated by David Breslin and Adrienne Edwards, exhibiting 63 artists and collectives, with installations extending over the 5th and 6th floors and adjacent balconies of the Whitney Museum building.

Artists 

The curators selected 63 artists for the biennial:

Lisa Alvarado
Harold Ancart
Mónica Arreola
Emily Barker
Yto Barrada
Rebecca Belmore
Jonathan Berger
Nayland Blake
Cassandra Press
Theresa Hak Kyung Cha
Raven Chacon
Leidy Churchman
Tony Cokes
Jacky Connolly
Matt Connors
Alex Da Corte
Aria Dean
Danielle Dean
Buck Ellison
Alia Farid
Coco Fusco
Ellen Gallagher
A Gathering of the Tribes/Steve Cannon
Cy Gavin
Adam Gordon
Renée Green
Pao Houa Her
EJ Hill
Alfredo Jaar
Rindon Johnson
Ivy Kwan Arce and Julie Tolentino
Ralph Lemon
Duane Linklater
James Little
Rick Lowe
Daniel Joseph Martinez
Dave McKenzie
Rodney McMillian
Na Mira
Alejandro "Luperca" Morales
Moved by the Motion
Terence Nance
Woody De Othello
Adam Pendleton
N. H. Pritchard
Lucy Raven
Charles Ray
Jason Rhoades
Andrew Roberts
Guadalupe Rosales
Veronica Ryan
Rose Salane 
Michael E. Smith
Sable Elyse Smith 
Awilda Sterling-Duprey
Rayyane Tabet
Denyse Thomasos
Trinh T. Minh-ha
WangShui
Eric Wesley
Dyani White Hawk
Kandis Williams

See also
Whitney Biennial
List of Whitney Biennial artists
List of Whitney Biennial curators

References

Further reading 

 

2022 in art
April 2022 events in the United States
Art exhibitions in the United States
Contemporary art exhibitions
Whitney Biennial